The 2018 Houston Astros season was the 57th season for the Major League Baseball (MLB) franchise in Houston, Texas, their 54th as the Astros, sixth in both the American League (AL) and AL West division, and 19th at Minute Maid Park. The Astros were the defending World Series champions, after winning the 2017 World Series four games to three over the Los Angeles Dodgers. Houston began the season March 29 against the Texas Rangers and finished the season on September 30 against the Baltimore Orioles, capping off an unprecedented second consecutive 100-win season.

They repeated as American League West champions and swept the Cleveland Indians in the Division Series to advance to the American League Championship Series, where they lost in five games to the Boston Red Sox.

The Astros once again sent a league-high six players to the 2018 All-Star Game. Additionally, ace Justin Verlander finished as runner-up for the American League Cy Young Award for the second time in three years.

Previous season

Summary
The Houston Astros entered the 2018 Major League Baseball season as defending World Series champions after defeating the Los Angeles Dodgers in seven games.  In addition to achieving their first-ever World Series championship, they claimed both their first American League (AL) pennant and AL West division championship. Center fielder George Springer was named the World Series Most Valuable Player (MVP) and right-handed starting pitcher Justin Verlander was the American League Championship Series (ALCS) MVP.  A number of regular season and multiple-sport awards went to second baseman José Altuve, including the AL MVP, Associated Press Male Athlete of the Year, Sports Illustrated Sportsperson of the Year, and The Sporting News Major League Player of the Year awards, among others.

Offseason
On January 23, 2018, first baseman Jon Singleton and pitcher Dean Deetz were suspended after testing positive for substances violating MLB's drug policy. Singleton, a former Astros' number-one prospect, had tested positive for the third time and was banned for 100 games.

Roster moves

 November 2, 2017: The following players became free agents at the conclusion of the World Series:
 Carlos Beltrán (DH):  Announced retirement from playing career on November 13, 2017.
 Tyler Clippard (RHP): Signed a minor league contract with the Toronto Blue Jays.
 Luke Gregerson (RHP):  Signed two-year, $11 million contract with the St. Louis Cardinals, with a vesting option for the 2020 season, on December 13, 2017.
 Francisco Liriano (LHP):  Signed one-year, $4 million contract with the Detroit Tigers.
 Cameron Maybin (OF): Signed one-year, $3.25 million contract with the Miami Marlins
 December 13:  Signed free agent right-handed relief pitcher Joe Smith to a two-year contract worth $14 million.

Regular season
Justin Verlander was the Opening Day starting pitcher for Houston at Globe Life Park in Arlington, versus Cole Hamels of the Texas Rangers.  It was Verlander's tenth career Opening Day start and first with Houston, as all nine previous had come as a member of the Detroit Tigers.  George Springer led the game off with a home run, becoming the first MLB player to lead off with a home run in consecutive Opening Days.  He had homered off Felix Hernandez of the Seattle Mariners in the first inning of Opening Day 2017 at Minute Maid Park.  Verlander pitched six shutout innings and struck out five.  The Astors won by a final score of 4–1.

Second baseman José Altuve reached 1,000 games played in his career on April 17, 2018, versus the Mariners.  He became the 20th player to appear in 1,000 games for the Astros.

Verlander was named AL Player of the Week on April 17.  In 15 innings over one start each versus the Rangers and Twins, he struck 20 and allowed a .100 opponents' batting average.

On May 7, 2018, Springer homered versus the Oakland Athletics and became the first player in Astros franchise history to record six hits in a nine-inning game. Joe Morgan had six hits in a twelve-inning game for the Astros on June 8, 1965.

On May 16, 2018, Verlander threw a complete game shutout against the Los Angeles Angels for his eighth career shutout and 24th complete game.  He struck out Shohei Ohtani in the top of the ninth inning for his 2,500th career strikeout, becoming the 33rd pitcher in Major League history to cross that threshold.  He was second among active leaders in strikeouts behind CC Sabathia.

Over three games versus the Cleveland Indians spanning May 25–27, Altuve recorded a base hit in each of 10 consecutive at bats, breaking his own club record of eight which he had set the year prior.  The streak included three doubles, one triple, and one home run.

Verlander was named AL Pitcher of the Month for May, his fifth career award.  In six starts, he produced a 0.86 ERA and .437 OPS against, allowed nine extra base hits, while striking out 50 over  innings.  He started and ended the month by dominating the Yankees—the only lineup in baseball with an OPS over .800—with 20 strikeouts in  innings, eight hits, and one run allowed.

On July 13, 2018, Charlie Morton was added to the American League roster for the 2018 MLB All-Star game making the Astros the only MLB team at the time to have all of their starting pitchers having at least one selection to participate in the MLB All-Star game.

On September 26, 2018, Houston won the American League West division title after the Oakland Athletics were defeated by the Seattle Mariners, following a 4–1 win against the Toronto Blue Jays.

Astros pitchers set a new MLB record by striking out 1,687 opposing batters during the season. The team had 96 games in which they struck out 10 or more batters, also a record. In addition, they were the first team to strike out 5 or more batters in each of 162 games.

Season standings

American League West

American League Wild Card

Record against opponents

Game log

Regular season

|- style="text-align:center; background:#cfc
| 1 || March 29 || @ Rangers || 4–1 || Verlander (1–0) || Hamels (0–1) || — || 47,253 || 1–0 || W1
|- style="text-align:center; background:#fbb
| 2 || March 30 || @ Rangers || 1–5 || Fister (1–0) || Keuchel (0–1) || — || 35,469 || 1–1 || L1
|- style="text-align:center; background:#cfc
| 3 || March 31 || @ Rangers || 9–3 || McCullers (1–0) || Moore (0–1) || — || 36,892 || 2–1 || W1
|-

|- style="text-align:center; background:#cfc
| 4 || April 1 || @ Rangers || 8–2 || Cole (1–0) || Minor (0–1) || — || 26,758 || 3–1 || W2
|- style="text-align:center; background:#cfc
| 5 || April 2 || Orioles || 6–1 || Morton (1–0) || Tillman (0–1) || — || 42,675 || 4–1 || W3
|- style="text-align:center; background:#cfc
| 6 || April 3 || Orioles || 10–6 || Rondón (1–0) || Araújo (0–1) || — || 37,106 || 5–1 || W4
|- style="text-align:center; background:#cfc
| 7 || April 4 || Orioles || 3–2 || Peacock (1–0) || Castro (0–1) || — || 27,698 || 6–1 || W5
|- style="text-align:center; background:#fbb
| 8 || April 6 || Padres || 1–4 || Perdomo (1–1) || McCullers (1–1) || Hand (2) || 41,138 || 6–2 || L1
|- style="text-align:center; background:#cfc
| 9 || April 7 || Padres || 1–0 || Devenski (1–0) || Erlin (0–1) || — || 42,306 || 7–2 || W1
|- style="text-align:center; background:#cfc
| 10 || April 8 || Padres || 4–1 || Morton (2–0) || Ross (1–1) || Peacock (1) || 37,093 || 8–2 || W2
|- style="text-align:center; background:#cfc
| 11 || April 9 || @ Twins || 2–0 || Verlander (2–0) || Rogers (1–1) || Giles (1) || 15,521 || 9–2 || W3
|- style="text-align:center; background:#fbb
| 12 || April 10 || @ Twins || 1–4 || Odorizzi (1–0) || Keuchel (0–2) || Rodney (2) || 15,500 || 9–3 || L1
|- style="text-align:center; background:#fbb
| 13 || April 11 || @ Twins || 8–9 || Rodney (1–1) || Peacock (1–1) || — || 15,438 || 9–4 || L2
|- style="text-align:center; background:#cfc
| 14 || April 13 || Rangers || 3–2 || Smith (1–0) || Jepsen (0–2) || Devenski (1) || 32,129 || 10–4 || W1
|- style="text-align:center; background:#fbb
| 15 || April 14 || Rangers || 5–6 (10) || Kela (1–0) || Harris (0–1) || Claudio (1) || 40,679 || 10–5 || L1
|- style="text-align:center; background:#fbb
| 16 || April 15 || Rangers || 1–3 (10) || Kela (2–0) || Rondón (1–1) || Diekman (1) || 31,803 || 10–6 || L2
|- style="text-align:center; background:#fbb
| 17 || April 16 || @ Mariners || 1–2 || Paxton (1–1) || Keuchel (0–3) || Díaz (7) || 12,923 || 10–7 || L3
|- style="text-align:center; background:#cfc
| 18 || April 17 || @ Mariners || 4–1 || McCullers (2–1) || Altavilla (1–2) || Devenski (2) || 15,382 || 11–7 || W1
|- style="text-align:center; background:#cfc
| 19 || April 18 || @ Mariners || 7–1 || Cole (2–0) || Leake (2–1) || — || 14,643 || 12–7 || W2
|- style="text-align:center; background:#cfc
| 20 || April 19 || @ Mariners || 9–2 || Morton (3–0) || Gonzales (1–2) || — || 16,927 || 13–7 || W3
|- style="text-align:center; background:#cfc
| 21 || April 20 || @ White Sox || 10–0 || Verlander (3–0) || Shields (1–2) || — || 14,211 || 14–7 || W4
|- style="text-align:center; background:#cfc
| 22 || April 21 || @ White Sox || 10–1 || Keuchel (1–3) || Giolito (0–3) || — || 23,902 || 15–7 || W5
|- style="text-align:center; background:#cfc
| 23 || April 22 || @ White Sox || 7–1 || McCullers (3–1) || Bummer (0–1) || — || 17,167 || 16–7 || W6
|- style="text-align:center; background:#fbb
| 24 || April 23 || Angels || 0–2 || Skaggs (3–1) || Cole (2–1)  || Middleton (6) || 29,606 || 16–8 || L1
|- style="text-align:center; background:#fbb
| 25 || April 24 || Angels || 7–8 || Johnson (2–0) || Smith (1–1) || Bedrosian (1) || 36,457 || 16–9 || L2
|- style="text-align:center; background:#cfc
| 26 || April 25 || Angels || 5–2 || Verlander (4–0) || Tropeano (1–2) || Giles (2) || 29,777 || 17–9 || W1
|- style="text-align:center; background:#fbb
| 27 || April 27 || Athletics || 1–8 || Manaea (4–2) || Keuchel (1–4) || — || 32,636 || 17–10 || L1
|- style="text-align:center; background:#cfc
| 28 || April 28 || Athletics || 11–0 || McCullers (4–1) || Mengden (2–3) || — || 41,493 || 18–10 || W1
|- style="text-align:center; background:#cfc
| 29 || April 29 || Athletics || 8–4 || Harris (1–1) || Cahill (1–1) || — || 39,131 || 19–10 || W2
|- style="text-align:center; background:#cfc
| 30 || April 30 || Yankees || 2–1 || Morton (4–0) || Gray (1–2) || Giles (3) || 30,061 || 20–10 || W3
|-

|- style="text-align:center; background:#fbb
| 31 || May 1 || Yankees || 0–4 || Robertson (2–1) || Giles (0–1) || — || 34,386 || 20–11 || L1
|- style="text-align:center; background:#fbb
| 32 || May 2 || Yankees || 0–4 || Severino (5–1) || Keuchel (1–5) || — || 31,617 || 20–12 || L2
|- style="text-align:center; background:#fbb
| 33 || May 3 || Yankees || 5–6 || Shreve (1–0) || Harris (1–2) || Chapman (7) || 34,838 || 20–13 || L3
|- style="text-align:center; background:#cfc
| 34 || May 4 || @ D-backs || 8–0 || Cole (3–1) || Medlen (0–1) || — || 29,463 || 21–13 || W1
|- style="text-align:center; background:#fbb
| 35 || May 5 || @ D-backs || 3–4 || Boxberger (1–2) || Devenski (1–1) || — || 39,154 || 21–14 || L1
|- style="text-align:center; background:#fbb
| 36 || May 6 || @ D-backs || 1–3 || Koch (2–0) || Verlander (4–1) || Boxberger (11) || 35,632 || 21–15 || L2
|- style="text-align:center; background:#cfc
| 37 || May 7 || @ Athletics || 16–2 || Keuchel (2–5) || Anderson (0–1) || — || 7,360 || 22–15 || W1
|- style="text-align:center; background:#cfc
| 38 || May 8 || @ Athletics || 4–2 || McCullers (5–1) || Manaea (4–4) || Giles (4) || 9,675 || 23–15 || W2
|- style="text-align:center; background:#cfc
| 39 || May 9 || @ Athletics || 4–1 || Cole (4–1) || Mengden (2–4) || Giles (5) || 18,044 || 24–15 || W3
|- style="text-align:center; background:#fbb
| 40 || May 11 || Rangers || 0–1 || Hamels (2–4) || Verlander (4–2) || Kela (8) || 34,297 || 24–16 || L1
|- style="text-align:center; background:#cfc
| 41 || May 12 || Rangers || 6–1 || Morton (5–0) || Fister (1–4) || — || 36,482 || 25–16 || W1
|- style="text-align:center; background:#cfc
| 42 || May 13 || Rangers || 6–1 || Keuchel (3–5) || Moore (1–5) || — || 39,405 || 26–16 || W2
|- style="text-align:center; background:#fbb
| 43 || May 14 || @ Angels || 1–2 || Heaney (2-2) || McCullers (5-2) || Anderson (1) || 28,229 || 26–17 || L1
|- style="text-align:center; background:#cfc
| 44 || May 15 || @ Angels || 5–3 || McHugh (1–0) || Álvarez (2–1) || Giles (6) || 28,358 || 27–17 || W1
|- style="text-align:center; background:#cfc
| 45 || May 16 || @ Angels || 2–0 || Verlander (5–2) || Richards (4–2) || — || 28,078 || 28–17 || W2
|- style="text-align:center; background:#cfc
| 46 || May 18 || Indians || 4–1 || Morton (6–0) || Clevinger (3–1) || Giles (7) || 35,959 || 29–17 || W3
|- style="text-align:center; background:#fbb
| 47 || May 19 || Indians || 4–5 || Kluber (7–2) || Keuchel (3–6) || Allen (6) || 39,926 || 29–18 || L1
|- style="text-align:center; background:#cfc
| 48 || May 20 || Indians || 3–1 || McCullers (6–2) || Carrasco (5–3) || Giles (8) || 30,770 || 30–18 || W1
|- style="text-align:center; background:#cfc
| 49 || May 22 || Giants || 11–2 || Cole (5–1) || Suárez (1–4) || — || 35,638 || 31–18 || W2
|- style="text-align:center; background:#cfc
| 50 || May 23 || Giants || 4–1 || Verlander (6–2) || Samardzija (1–3) || Giles (9) || 31,929 || 32–18 || W3
|- style="text-align:center; background:#cfc
| 51 || May 24 || @ Indians || 8–2 || Morton (7–0) || Clevinger (3–2) || — || 19,660 || 33–18 || W4
|- style="text-align:center; background:#cfc
| 52 || May 25 || @ Indians || 11–2 || Smith (2–1) || Miller (1–3) || — || 29,431 || 34–18 || W5
|- style="text-align:center; background:#fbb
| 53 || May 26 || @ Indians || 6–8 || Carrasco (6–3) || McCullers (6–3) || Allen (8) || 30,639 || 34–19 || L1
|- style="text-align:center; background:#fbb
| 54 || May 27 || @ Indians || 9–10 (14) || Otero (1–1) || Peacock (1–2) || — || 27,765 || 34–20 || L2
|- style="text-align:center; background:#cfc
| 55 || May 28 || @ Yankees || 5–1 || Verlander (7–2) || Germán (0–3) || — || 46,583 || 35–20 || W1
|- style="text-align:center; background:#fbb
| 56 || May 29 || @ Yankees || 5–6 (10) || Chapman (2–0) || Peacock (1–3) || — || 45,458 || 35–21 || L1
|- style="text-align:center; background:#fbb
| 57 || May 30 || @ Yankees || 3–5 || Severino (8–1) || Keuchel (3–7) || Chapman (12) || 45,229 || 35–22 || L2
|- style="text-align:center; background:#cfc
| 58 || May 31 || Red Sox || 4–2 || McCullers (7–3) || Pomeranz (1–3) || Giles (10) || 30,658 || 36–22 || W1
|-

|- style="text-align:center; background:#cfc
| 59 || June 1 || Red Sox || 7–3 || Cole (6–1) || Sale (5–3) || — || 37,244 || 37–22 || W2
|- style="text-align:center; background:#fbb
| 60 || June 2 || Red Sox || 3–5 || Price (6–4) || Harris (1–3) || Kimbrel (19) || 38,640 || 37–23 || L1
|- style="text-align:center; background:#fbb
| 61 || June 3 || Red Sox || 3–9 || Porcello (8–2) || Morton (7–1) || — || 33,431 || 37–24 || L2
|- style="text-align:center; background:#fbb
| 62 || June 5 || Mariners || 1–7 || Paxton (5–1) || Keuchel (3–8) || — || 35,646 || 37–25 || L3
|- style="text-align:center; background:#cfc
| 63 || June 6 || Mariners || 7–5 || Devenski (2–1) || Nicasio (1–3) || Rondón (1) || 30,361 || 38–25 || W1
|- style="text-align:center; background:#cfc
| 64 || June 7 || @ Rangers || 5–2 || Cole (7–1) || Hamels (3–6) || — || 30,236 || 39–25 || W2
|- style="text-align:center; background:#cfc
| 65 || June 8 || @ Rangers || 7–3 || Verlander (8–2) || Fister (1–7) || — || 31,722 || 40–25 || W3
|- style="text-align:center; background:#cfc
| 66 || June 9 || @ Rangers || 4–3 || Sipp (1–0) || Leclerc (1–2) || Rondón (2) || 38,068 || 41–25 || W4
|- style="text-align:center; background:#cfc
| 67 || June 10 || @ Rangers || 8–7 || Harris (2–3) || Kela (3–3) || Rondón (3) || 30,251 || 42–25 || W5
|- style="text-align:center; background:#cfc
| 68 || June 12 || @ Athletics || 6–3 || McCullers (8–3) || Mengden (6–6) || Giles (11) || 11,742 || 43–25 || W6
|- style="text-align:center; background:#cfc
| 69 || June 13 || @ Athletics || 13–5 || Cole (8–1) || Blackburn (1–1) || — || 9,164 || 44–25 || W7
|- style="text-align:center; background:#cfc
| 70 || June 14 || @ Athletics || 7–3 || Verlander (9–2) || Montas (3–1) || — || 13,009 || 45–25 || W8
|- style="text-align:center; background:#cfc
| 71 || June 15 || @ Royals || 7–3 || Morton (8–1) || Junis (5–7) || — || 27,603 || 46–25 || W9
|- style="text-align:center; background:#cfc
| 72 || June 16 || @ Royals || 10–2 || Keuchel (4–8) || Duffy (3–7) || — || 20,657 || 47–25 || W10
|- style="text-align:center; background:#cfc
| 73 || June 17 || @ Royals || 7–4 || Sipp (2–0) || Maurer (0–3) || Rondón (4) || 22,326 || 48–25 || W11
|- style="text-align:center; background:#cfc
| 74 || June 18 || Rays || 5–4 || McHugh (2–0) || Romo (1–2) || — || 34,151 || 49–25 || W12
|- style="text-align:center; background:#fbb
| 75 || June 19 || Rays || 1–2 || Snell (9–4) || Rondón (1–2) || Romo (4) || 37,414 || 49–26 || L1
|- style="text-align:center; background:#cfc
| 76 || June 20 || Rays || 5–1 || Morton (9–1) || Eovaldi (1–3) || — || 43,409 || 50–26 || W1
|- style="text-align:center; background:#fbb
| 77 || June 22 || Royals || 0–1 || Grimm (1–2) || Giles (0–2) || Hill (1) || 39,357 || 50–27 || L1
|- style="text-align:center; background:#cfc
| 78 || June 23 || Royals || 4–3 (12) || McHugh (3–0) || Grimm (1–3) || — || 40,028 || 51–27 || W1
|- style="text-align:center; background:#cfc
| 79 || June 24 || Royals || 11–3 || Cole (9–1) || Hammel (2–9) || — || 41,823 || 52–27 || W2
|- style="text-align:center; background:#fbb
| 80 || June 25 || Blue Jays || 3–6 || Happ (10–3) || Verlander (9–3) || Oh (2) || 28,791 || 52–28 || L1
|- style="text-align:center; background:#cfc
| 81 || June 26 || Blue Jays || 7–0 || Morton (10–1) || Borucki (0–1) || — || 38,700 || 53–28 || W1
|- style="text-align:center; background:#cfc
| 82 || June 27 || Blue Jays || 7–6 || Harris (3–3) || Tepera (5–3) || — || 39,191 || 54–28 || W2
|- style="text-align:center; background:#cfc
| 83 || June 28 || @ Rays || 1–0 || McCullers (9–3) || Yarbrough (7–4) || Rondón (5) || 12,305 || 55–28 || W3
|- style="text-align:center; background:#fbb
| 84 || June 29 || @ Rays || 2–3 || Font (2–3) || Cole (9–2) || Alvarado (2) || 15,797 || 55–29 || L1
|- style="text-align:center; background:#fbb
| 85 || June 30 || @ Rays || 2–5 || Nuño (2–0) || Verlander (9–4) || Romo (7) || 18,378 || 55–30 || L2
|-

|- style="text-align:center; background:#fbb
| 86 || July 1 || @ Rays || 2–3 || Snell (11–4) || Morton (10–2) || Romo (8) || 19,334 || 55–31 || L3
|- style="text-align:center; background:#cfc
| 87 || July 3 || @ Rangers || 5–3 || Keuchel (5–8) || Bibens-Dirkx (1–2) || Rondón (6) || 40,165 || 56–31 || W1
|- style="text-align:center; background:#cfc
| 88 || July 4 || @ Rangers || 5–4 (10) || McHugh (4–0) || Martin (1–2) || Giles (12) || 43,592 || 57–31 || W2
|- style="text-align:center; background:#cfc
| 89 || July 5 || White Sox || 4–3 || Smith (3–1) || Soria (0–3)|| — || 34,955 || 58–31 || W3
|- style="text-align:center; background:#cfc
| 90 || July 6 || White Sox || 11–4 || McCullers (10–3) || López (4–6) || Peacock (2) || 38,153 || 59–31 || W4
|- style="text-align:center; background:#cfc
| 91 || July 7 || White Sox || 12–6 || Morton (11–2) || Shields (3–10) || — || 39,568 || 60–31 || W5
|- style="text-align:center; background:#cfc
| 92 || July 8 || White Sox || 2–1 || Keuchel (6–8) || Giolito (5–8) || Rondón (7) || 41,654 || 61–31 || W6
|- style="text-align:center; background:#fbb
| 93 || July 9 || Athletics || 0–2 || Montas (5–2) || Peacock (1–4) || Treinen (23) || 28,301 || 61–32 || L1
|- style="text-align:center; background:#cfc
| 94 || July 10 || Athletics || 6–5 (11) || McHugh (5–0) || Treinen (5–2) || — || 34,585 || 62–32 || W1
|- style="text-align:center; background:#fbb
| 95 || July 11 || Athletics || 3–8 || Bassitt (2–3) || McCullers (10–4) || — || 41,119 || 62–33 || L1
|- style="text-align:center; background:#fbb
| 96 || July 12 || Athletics || 4–6 || Petit (3–2) || Devenski (2–2) || Trivino (4) || 38,900 || 62–34 || L2
|- style="text-align:center; background:#cfc
| 97 || July 13 || Tigers || 3–0 || Keuchel (7–8) || Fiers (6–6) || Rondón (8) || 38,843 || 63–34 || W1
|- style="text-align:center; background:#cfc
| 98 || July 14 || Tigers || 9–1 || Cole (10–2) || Fulmer (3–9) || — || 40,405 || 64–34 || W2
|- style="text-align:center; background:#fbb
| 99 || July 15 || Tigers || 3–6 || VerHagen (1–2) || Verlander (9–5) || — || 39,455 || 64–35 || L1
|- style="text-align:center; background:#bbcaff;"
| colspan="10" | 89th All-Star Game in Washington, D.C.
|- style="text-align:center; background:#cfc
| 100 || July 20 || @ Angels || 3–1 || Keuchel (8–8) || Skaggs (7–6) || Rondón (9) || 42,422 || 65–35 || W1
|- style="text-align:center; background:#cfc
| 101 || July 21 || @ Angels || 7–0 || Verlander (10–5) || Tropeano (3–5) || — || 44,264 || 66–35 || W2
|- style="text-align:center; background:#fbb
| 102 || July 22 || @ Angels || 5–14 || Heaney (6–6) || McCullers (10–5) || — || 35,298 || 66–36 || L1
|- style="text-align:center; background:#cfc
| 103 || July 24 || @ Rockies || 8–2 (10) || Rondón (2–2) || Davis (0–3) || — || 43,184 || 67–36 || W1
|- style="text-align:center; background:#fbb
| 104 || July 25 || @ Rockies || 2–3 || Davis (1–3) || McHugh (5–1) || — || 40,948 || 67–37 || L1
|- style="text-align:center; background:#fbb
| 105 || July 27 || Rangers || 2–11 ||Gallardo (5–1) ||Keuchel (8–9) || — || 42,592 || 67–38 || L2
|- style="text-align:center; background:#fbb
| 106 || July 28 || Rangers || 3–7 ||Jurado (1–1) ||Verlander (10–6) || — || 43,093 || 67–39 || L3
|- style="text-align:center; background:#fbb
| 107 || July 29 || Rangers || 3–4 ||Minor (7–6) ||McCullers (10–6) ||Kela (24) || 40,560 || 67–40 || L4
|- style="text-align:center; background:#fbb
| 108 || July 30 || @ Mariners || 0–2 || Paxton (9–4) || Cole (10–3) || Díaz (40) || 35,198 || 67–41 || L5
|- style="text-align:center; background:#cfc
| 109 || July 31 || @ Mariners || 5–2 || Morton (12–2) || Leake (8–7) || Rondón (10) || 28,478 || 68–41 || W1
|-

|- style="text-align:center; background:#cfc
| 110 || August 1 || @ Mariners || 8–3 || Keuchel (9–9) || LeBlanc (6–2) || — || 34,575 || 69–41 || W2
|- style="text-align:center; background:#cfc
| 111 || August 3 || @ Dodgers || 2–1 || Verlander (11–6) || Wood (7–6) || Rondón (11) || 53,598 || 70–41 || W3
|- style="text-align:center; background:#cfc
| 112 || August 4 || @ Dodgers || 14–0 || Peacock (2–4) || Maeda (7–7) || — || 53,119 || 71–41 || W4
|- style="text-align:center; background:#fbb
| 113 || August 5 || @ Dodgers || 2–3 || Buehler (5–4) || Cole (10–4) || Jansen (31) || 50,628 || 71–42 || L1
|- style="text-align:center; background:#cfc
| 114 || August 6 || @ Giants || 3–1 || Osuna (1–0) || Smith (1–2) || Rondón (12) || 40,251 || 72–42 || W1 
|- style="text-align:center; background:#cfc
| 115 || August 7 || @ Giants || 2–1 || Smith (4–1) || Black (1–1) || Rondón (13) || 41,613 || 73–42 || W2
|- style="text-align:center; background:#fbb
| 116 || August 9 || Mariners || 6–8 || Paxton (10–5) || Verlander (11–7) || Díaz (43) || 34,976 || 73–43 || L1 
|- style="text-align:center; background:#fbb
| 117 || August 10 || Mariners || 2–5 || Warren (1–1) || Cole (10–5) || Díaz (44) || 41,236 || 73–44 || L2 
|- style="text-align:center; background:#fbb
| 118 || August 11 || Mariners || 2–3 || LeBlanc (7–2) || Morton (12–3) || Díaz (45) || 38,888 || 73–45 || L3 
|- style="text-align:center; background:#fbb
| 119 || August 12 || Mariners || 3–4 (10) || Duke (5–4) || Osuna (1–1) || Díaz (46) || 40,048 || 73–46 || L4 
|- style="text-align:center; background:#fbb
| 120 || August 14 || Rockies || 1–5 || Márquez (10–9) || Verlander (11–8) || — || 35,813 || 73–47 || L5 
|- style="text-align:center; background:#cfc
| 121 || August 15 || Rockies || 12–1 || Cole (11–5) || Anderson (6–5) || — || 29,967 || 74–47 || W1 
|- style="text-align:center; background:#fbb
| 122 || August 17 || @ Athletics || 3–4  (10)  || Treinen (6–2) || Sipp (2–1) || — || 23,535 || 74–48 || L1 
|- style="text-align:center; background:#fbb
| 123 || August 18 || @ Athletics || 1–7 || Cahill (5–2) || Keuchel (9–10) || — || 32,204 || 74–49 || L2
|- style="text-align:center; background:#cfc
| 124 || August 19 || @ Athletics || 9–4 || Verlander (12–8) || Manaea 11–9) || — || 29,143 || 75–49 || W1 
|- style="text-align:center; background:#fbb
| 125 || August 20 || @ Mariners || 4–7 || Colomé (4–5) || McHugh (5–2) || Díaz (48) || 27,072 || 75–50 || L1
|- style="text-align:center; background:#cfc
| 126 || August 21 || @ Mariners || 3–2 || Valdez (1–0) || Detwiler (0–1) ||  Rondón (14) || 25,415 || 76–50 || W1 
|- style="text-align:center; background:#cfc
| 127 || August 22 || @ Mariners || 10–7 || Morton (13–3) || Gonzales (12–9) || Osuna (10) || 31,062 || 77–50 || W2 
|- style="text-align:center; background:#cfc
| 128 || August 24 || @ Angels || 9–3 || Keuchel (10–10) || Heaney (7–8) || — || 42,788 || 78–50 || W3 
|- style="text-align:center; background:#cfc
| 129 || August 25 || @ Angels || 8–3 || Verlander (13–8) || Barría (8–8) || — || 41,654 || 79–50 || W4 
|- style="text-align:center; background:#cfc
| 130 || August 26 || @ Angels || 3–1 || Valdez (2–0) || Peña (1–4) || Osuna (11) || 37,530 || 80–50 || W5 
|- style="text-align:center; background:#cfc
| 131 || August 27 || Athletics || 11–4 || Cole (12–5) || Anderson (3–4) || — || 43,171 || 81–50 || W6 
|- style="text-align:center; background:#fbb
| 132 || August 28 || Athletics || 3–4 || Familia (8–4) || Osuna (1–2) || Treinen (33) || 33,136 || 81–51 || L1 
|- style="text-align:center; background:#cfc
| 133 || August 29 || Athletics || 5–4 || Osuna (2–2) || Familia (8–5) || — || 32,926 || 82–51 || W1 
|- style="text-align:center; background:#fbb
| 134 || August 30 || Angels || 2–5 ||Heaney (8–8) ||Verlander (13–9) || — || |30,371|| 82–52 || L1
|- style="text-align:center; background:#fbb
| 135 || August 31 || Angels || 0–3 ||Barría (9–8) || Valdez (2–1) ||Parker (13)|| | 35,675 || 82–53 || L2
|-

|- style="text-align:center; background:#cfc
| 136 || September 1 || Angels || 7–3 || Smith (5–1) || Bedrosian (5–4) || — || 41,622 || 83–53 || W1 
|- style="text-align:center; background:#cfc
| 137 || September 2 || Angels || 4–2 || Cole (13–5) || Ohtani (4–2) || Osuna (12) || 41,506 || 84–53 || W2 
|- style="text-align:center; background:#cfc
| 138 || September 3 || Twins || 4–1 || Keuchel (11–10) || Gibson (7–12) || Peacock (3) || 39,559 || 85–53 || W3 
|- style="text-align:center; background:#cfc
| 139 || September 4 || Twins || 5–2 || Verlander (14–9) || May (3–1) || Osuna (13) || 31,315 || 86–53 || W4 
|- style="text-align:center; background:#cfc
| 140 || September 5 || Twins || 9–1 || Valdez (3–1) || Odorizzi (5–10) || — || 31,011 || 87–53 || W5 
|- style="text-align:center; background:#cfc
| 141 || September 7 || @ Red Sox || 6–3 || Pressly (2–1) || Kelly (4–2) || Osuna (14) || 36,930 || 88–53 || W6 
|- style="text-align:center; background:#cfc
| 142 || September 8 || @ Red Sox || 5–3 || Morton (14–3) || Rodríguez (12–4) || Osuna (15) || 36,684 || 89–53 || W7 
|- style="text-align:center; background:#fbb
| 143 || September 9 || @ Red Sox || 5–6 || Kimbrel (5–1) || Rondón (2–3) || — || 32,787 || 89–54 || L1
|- style="text-align:center; background:#cfc
| 144 || September 10 || @ Tigers || 3–2 || Verlander (15–9) || Liriano (4–10) || Osuna (16) || 19,711 || 90–54 || W1
|- style="text-align:center; background:#cfc
| 145 || September 11 || @ Tigers || 5–4 || Harris (4–3) || Zimmermann (7–7) || Osuna (17) || 19,432 || 91–54 || W2 
|- style="text-align:center; background:#cfc
| 146 || September 12 || @ Tigers || 5–4 || Cole (14–5) || Norris (0–4) || Pressly (1) || 22,666 || 92–54 || W3 
|- style="text-align:center; background:#fbb
| 147 || September 14 || D-backs || 2–4 || Ziegler (2–6) || Rondón (2–4) || Hirano (2) || 36,924 || 92–55 || L1
|- style="text-align:center; background:#cfc
| 148 || September 15 || D-backs || 10–4 ||Morton (15–3) || Godley (14–10)|| — || 38,345 || 93–55 || W1
|- style="text-align:center; background:#cfc
| 149 || September 16 || D-backs || 5–4 ||Verlander (16–9) ||Greinke (14–10) ||Osuna (18) || 37,889 || 94–55  || W2
|- style="text-align:center; background:#fbb
| 150 || September 17 || Mariners || 1–4 ||Cook (2–1) ||Rondón (2–5) ||Díaz (56) || 43,145 || 94–56 || L1 
|- style="text-align:center; background:#cfc
| 151 || September 18 || Mariners || 7–0 ||James (1–0) ||Leake (10–10) ||– || 35,715 || 95–56 || W1
|- style="text-align:center; background:#fbb
| 152 || September 19 || Mariners || 0–9 ||Lawrence (1–0) ||Keuchel (11–11) || – || 31,229 || 95–57 || L1
|- style="text-align:center; background:#cfc
| 153 || September 21 || Angels || 11–3 || Cole (15–5) || Heaney (9–10) || — || 39,977 || 96–57 || W1
|- style="text-align:center; background:#cfc
| 154 || September 22 || Angels || 10–5 ||McHugh (6–2)  ||Buttrey (0–1) || — || 41,822 || 97–57 || W2
|- style="text-align:center; background:#cfc
| 155 || September 23 || Angels || 6–2 ||Valdez (4–1) ||Skaggs (8–9) || — || 43,247 || 98–57 || W3
|- style="text-align:center; background:#cfc
| 156 || September 24 || @ Blue Jays || 5–3 || Keuchel (12–11) || Estrada (7–14) ||Osuna (19) || 23,463 || 99–57 || W4
|- style="text-align:center; background:#cfc
| 157 || September 25 || @ Blue Jays || 4–1 || James (2–0) || Gaviglio (3–9) || Osuna (20) || 28,440 || 100–57 || W5
|- style="text-align:center; background:#fbb
|158 || September 26 || @ Blue Jays || 1–3 || Biagini (4–7) ||Devenski (2–3) ||Giles (25) || 22,828 || 100–58 || L1
|- style="text-align:center; background:#ccc
| — || September 27 || @ Orioles || colspan=8 | Postponed (rain). Makeup date: September 29.
|- style="text-align:center; background:#cfc
| 159 || September 28 || @ Orioles || 2–1 ||Sipp (3–1) || Scott (3–3) ||Osuna (21) || 18,434 || 101–58 || W1 
|- style="text-align:center; background:#cfc
| 160 || September 29 (1) || @ Orioles || 4–3 || Harris (5–3) || Gilmartin (1–1) || Rondón (15) || 26,020 || 102–58 || W2
|- style="text-align:center; background:#cfc
| 161 || September 29 (2) || @ Orioles || 5–2 ||Peacock (3–4) || Ramírez (1–8) ||Pressly (2) || 26,020 || 103–58 || W3
|- style="text-align:center; background:#fbb
| 162 || September 30 || @ Orioles || 0–4 || Fry (1–2) ||Peacock (3–5) || — || 24,916 || 103–59 || L1
|-

Postseason

|- style="text-align:center; background:#cfc
| 1 || October 5 || Indians || 7–2 || Verlander (1–0) || Kluber (0–1) || — || 43,514 || 1–0 
|- style="text-align:center; background:#cfc
| 2 || October 6 || Indians || 3–1 || Cole (1–0) || Carrasco (0–1) || Osuna (1) || 43,520 || 2–0 
|- style="text-align:center; background:#cfc
| 3 || October 8 || @ Indians || 11–3 ||McHugh (1–0) || Bauer (0–1) || — || 37,252 || 3–0
|-

|- style="text-align:center; background:#cfc
| 1 || October 13 || @ Red Sox || 7–2 || Verlander (1–0) || Kelly (0–1) || — || 38,007 || 1–0
|- style="text-align:center; background:#fbb
| 2 || October 14 || @ Red Sox || 5–7 || Barnes (1–0) || Cole (0–1) || Kimbrel (1) || 37,960 || 1–1
|- style="text-align:center; background:#fbb
| 3 || October 16 || Red Sox || 2–8 || Eovaldi (1–0) || Smith (0–1) || — || 43,102 || 1–2
|- style="text-align:center; background:#fbb
| 4 || October 17 || Red Sox || 6–8 || Kelly (1–1) || James (0–1) || Kimbrel (2) || 43,277 || 1–3
|- style="text-align:center; background:#fbb
| 5 || October 18 || Red Sox || 1–4 || Price (1–0) || Verlander (1–1) || Kimbrel (3) || 43,210 || 1–4
|-

Postseason rosters

| style="text-align:left" | 
Pitchers: 29 Tony Sipp 31 Collin McHugh 35 Justin Verlander 36 Will Harris 43 Lance McCullers Jr. 45 Gerrit Cole 50 Charlie Morton 54 Roberto Osuna 55 Ryan Pressly 60 Dallas Keuchel 63 Josh James
Catchers: 15 Martín Maldonado 16 Brian McCann
Infielders: 1 Carlos Correa 2 Alex Bregman 9 Marwin González 10 Yuli Gurriel 27 José Altuve 
Outfielders: 4 George Springer 18 Tony Kemp 22 Josh Reddick 26 Myles Straw
Designated hitters: 11 Evan Gattis 13 Tyler White
|- valign="top"
 

| style="text-align:left" | 
Pitchers: 29 Tony Sipp 30 Héctor Rondón 31 Collin McHugh 35 Justin Verlander 38 Joe Smith 43 Lance McCullers Jr. 45 Gerrit Cole 50 Charlie Morton 54 Roberto Osuna 55 Ryan Pressly 60 Dallas Keuchel 63 Josh James
Catchers: 15 Martín Maldonado 16 Brian McCann
Infielders: 1 Carlos Correa 2 Alex Bregman 9 Marwin González 10 Yuli Gurriel 27 José Altuve 
Outfielders: 4 George Springer 6 Jake Marisnick 18 Tony Kemp 22 Josh Reddick 
Designated hitters: 11 Evan Gattis 13 Tyler White
|- valign="top"

Roster

Farm system

See also

 List of Major League Baseball 100 win seasons
 List of Major League Baseball franchise postseason streaks
 List of Major League Baseball single-game hits leaders

References

External links
Houston Astros season official site 
2018 Houston Astros season at Baseball Reference

Houston Astros seasons
Houston Astros
Houston Astros
American League West champion seasons